Kaddour Slimani (born 25 December 1984) is a Moroccan-born Italian male long-distance runner who competed at 2010 IAAF World Cross Country Championships.

Biography
Slimani become Italian citizen in 2007, at 28, per married with Wilma Biancossi.

National titles
He won a national championships at individual senior level.
Italian Cross Country Championships
Long race: 2010

See also
 Naturalized athletes of Italy

References

External links
 
 
 Kaddour Slimani at FIDAL 

1984 births
Living people
Italian male long-distance runners
Italian male cross country runners
Naturalised citizens of Italy